Elizabeth Downs is a northern suburb of Adelaide, South Australia in the City of Playford. It is east of Main North Road, bounded by Main North Road, Uley Road, Adams Road, Yorktown Road and Garlick Road. The suburb contains two government primary schools and a local shopping centre. Craigmore High School is just outside the northern boundary, and a larger shopping centre on the other side of Main North Road. It also has a tavern with bars, bistro and bottle shop.

Open space
The Argana Park sports precinct in the southwest of the suburb is home to football, rugby league, cricket and netball clubs. More playing fields in the northeastern corner of the suburb include a local soccer club and more cricket. Smith Creek linear park separates these from the rest of the suburb. There is a linear reserve along the easement for a major water pipe, the Barossa Trunk Main, running roughly north–south above ground through Elizabeth Downs. There is also a buffer reserve along Main North Road.

References

Suburbs of Adelaide